De Bazelaire was a French car maker founded in 1907 by Fernand de Bazelaire.

History 
The plant established at Rue Gager-Gabillot in Paris (15e), produced more than thirty models from 1907 to 1928. The cars were intended for racing, but were built with a luxury look. The showroom was located at Avenue des Ternes, in Paris (17e).

The car first appeared on a race track in July 1908 in the Coupe de l'Auto race, the engine had a capacity of 1460 cc and delivered  at 1800 rpm. The top speed of the car was 59 mph, models with a six-cylinder engine were built during the 1910s. After World War I, De Bazelaire manufactured cars with a 2.1 litre S.C.A.P. engine.

Fernand de Bazelaire took part in several races, driving his own cars, notably at the Coupe des Voiturettes at Boulogne-sur-mer (1910) 
 and at the  Tour de France Automobile (1912).

The car manufacturer ceased its activities in 1928, when Fernand de Bazelaire joined the French car maker Delahaye.

De Bazelaire model(s)
De Bazelaire 10CV (1910)

References

Further reading
G.N. Georgano  - The complete encyclopedia of motorcars, 1885 to the present - Dutton, 1973 - pages 234 and 235
Alain Plantier - Les Automobiles F. de Bazelaire - Editions du Palmier - Nîmes, 2020 (french)

External links 
Coupe de l'Auto 1908 information: 

Defunct motor vehicle manufacturers of France